A total of 37 teams entered the 1938 FIFA World Cup qualification rounds, competing for a total of 16 spots in the final tournament. For the first time the title holders and the host country were given automatic qualification. Therefore, France, as the hosts, and Italy, as the defending champions, qualified automatically, leaving 14 spots open for competition.

Due to the Spanish Civil War, Spain  withdrew from the competition. The remaining 34 teams were divided into 12 groups, based on geographical considerations, as follows:

Groups 1 to 9 – Europe: 11 places, contested by 23 teams (including Egypt and Palestine).
Groups 10 and 11 – The Americas: 2 places, contested by 9 teams.
Group 12 – Asia: 1 place, contested by 2 teams.
However, due to the withdrawal of Austria after qualifying (they had been annexed by Germany), only 15 teams actually competed in the final tournament. FIFA did not offer participation to the runner-up of the group that Austria had played in, Latvia.

A total of 21 teams played at least one qualifying match. A total of 22 qualifying matches were played, and 96 goals were scored (an average of 4.36 per match).

Format
The 12 groups had different rules, as follows:
Group 1 had 4 teams. The teams played against each other once. The group winner and runner-up would qualify.
Groups 2, 3, 4, 5 and 7 had 2 teams each. The teams, except in Group 5, played against each other on a home-and-away basis. The group winners would qualify. In Group 5, Switzerland and Portugal were to play only one match on a neutral ground with the winner to qualify.
Groups 6 and 8 had 3 teams each. The strongest team of each group was seeded. There would be two rounds of play:
 First Round: The seeded team received a bye and advanced to the Final Round directly. The remaining 2 teams played against each other on a home-and-away basis. The winner would advance to the Final Round.
 Final Round: The seeded team played against the winner of the First Round at home. The winner would qualify.
Group 9 had 3 teams. The teams played against each other once. The group winner and runner-up would qualify.
Group 10 had 2 teams. The group winner would qualify.
Group 11 had 7 teams. The group winner would qualify.
Group 12 had 2 teams. The group winner would qualify.

Key:
Teams highlighted in green qualified for the finals.
Teams highlighted in Orange qualified for the final phase of their group.

Groups

Group 1

 

 

 

 

 

Germany and Sweden qualified.

Group 2

 

Norway qualified.

Group 3

 

Poland finished above Yugoslavia on goal average, and thus qualified.

Group 4

Egypt were to play Romania on 17 December 1937. However, Egypt withdrew from the competition after Egyptian officials objected to playing on this date since it was in the holy month of Ramadan. Therefore, Romania qualified after Egypt invited Austrian club side First Vienna to play the friendly match against the national team.

Group 5

Switzerland qualified.

Group 6

First round

 

Greece qualified for the final round.

Final round

Hungary qualified.

Group 7

 

Czechoslovakia qualified.

Group 8

First round

 

Latvia qualified for the final round.

Final round

Austria qualified, but was later incorporated by Germany during the Anschluss. FIFA offered the place to England (winner of the 1937–38 British Home Championship), who had opted not to enter the competition, but they declined the offer; FIFA decided not to allow anyone else to qualify, leaving the World Cup one team short.

Group 9

 

 

Netherlands and Belgium qualified.

Group 10

Argentina withdrew, so Brazil qualified automatically.

Group 11

First round

Costa Rica, Dutch Guiana, El Salvador, Mexico, Colombia and the United States all withdrew, so Cuba qualified automatically for the second round.

Second round
All other teams than Cuba had withdrawn from competition, so thus qualified automatically for the finals.

Group 12

Japan withdrew, so Indonesia qualified automatically.

Qualified teams

 withdrew after qualifying due to the Anschluss.
(h) – qualified automatically as hosts
(c) – qualified automatically as defending champions

Goalscorers

5 goals

 Gyula Zsengellér
 Fricis Kaņeps

4 goals

 Reidar Kvammen

3 goals

 Ladislav Šimůnek
 Ernst Lehner
 Kleanthis Vikelidis
 József Nemes
 Iļja Vestermans
 Piet de Boer
 Lennart Bunke
 Gustav Wetterström

2 goals

 Oldřich Nejedlý
 Georg Siimenson
 Josef Gauchel
 Helmut Schön
 Otto Siffling
 Pál Titkos
 Jimmy Dunne
 Vaclavs Borduško
 Jonas Paulionis
 Alf Martinsen
 Leonard Piontek
 Gustaf Josefsson

1 goal

 Franz Binder
 Camillo Jerusalem
 Raymond Braine
 Hendrik Isemborghs
 Bernard Voorhoof
 François Devries
 Georgi Panchediev
 Josef Ludl
 Jan Říha
 Richard Kuremaa
 Heinrich Uukkivi
 Fritz Szepan
 Adolf Urban
 Lefteris Makris
 Antonis Migiakis
 Jenő Vincze
 Harry Duggan
 Matty Geoghegan
 Kevin O'Flanagan
 Juozas Gudelis
 Gusty Kemp
 Camille Libar
 Peri Neufeld
 Kick Smit
 Henk van Spaandonck
 Ernst Wilimowski
 Jerzy Wostal
 Fernando Peyroteo
 Sven Jonasson
 Erik Persson
 Kurt Svanström
 Georges Aeby
 Lauro Amadò
 Blagoje Marjanović

Notes
 It was originally intended that the World Cup would be held alternately between the continents of South America and Europe. However Jules Rimet, the creator of the World Cup, convinced FIFA to hold the competition in France, his home country. Because of this controversial move, many American countries, including Argentina (the most likely hosts if the event was held in South America), Chile, Paraguay, Peru, Colombia, Costa Rica, El Salvador, Mexico, Dutch Guiana, Uruguay, and the United States, all withdrew or refused to enter.. Brazil and Cuba were the only countries from the Americas to enter qualification and thus qualified for the World Cup by default.

References

External links
FIFA World Cup Official Site - 1938 World Cup Qualification
RSSSF - 1938 World Cup Qualification

 
Qualification
FIFA World Cup qualification
Football World Cup